Geneva is the second-most populous city in Switzerland (after Zürich) and the most populous city of Romandy, the French-speaking part of Switzerland. Situated in the south west of the country, where the Rhône exits Lake Geneva, it is the capital of the Republic and Canton of Geneva.

Geneva is a global city, a financial centre, and a worldwide centre for diplomacy due to the presence of numerous international organizations, including the headquarters of many agencies of the United Nations and the Red Cross. Geneva hosts the highest number of international organizations in the world. It is also where the Geneva Conventions were signed, which chiefly concern the treatment of wartime non-combatants and prisoners of war. Together with, for instance, New York City (global headquarters of the UN), Basel (Bank for International Settlements), and Strasbourg (Council of Europe), Geneva is a city serving as the headquarters of one of the most important international organizations, without being the capital of a country.

In 2021, Geneva was ranked as the world's ninth most important financial centre for competitiveness by the Global Financial Centres Index, fifth in Europe behind London, Zürich, Frankfurt and Luxembourg. In 2019, Geneva was ranked among the ten most liveable cities in the world by Mercer together with Zürich and Basel. The city has been referred to as the world's most compact metropolis and the "Peace Capital". In 2019, Mercer ranked Geneva as the thirteenth most expensive city in the world. In a UBS ranking of global cities in 2018, Geneva was ranked first for gross earnings, second most expensive, and fourth in purchasing power.

Name 
The city was mentioned in Latin texts, by Caesar, with the spelling Genava, probably from the Celtic  from the stem  ("bend, knee"), in the sense of a bending river or estuary, an etymology shared with the Italian port city of Genoa (in Italian Genova).

The medieval county of Geneva in Middle Latin was known as pagus major Genevensis or Comitatus Genevensis (also Gebennensis). After 1400 it became the Genevois province of Savoy (albeit not extending to the city proper, until the reformation of the seat of the Bishop of Geneva).

History 

Geneva was an Allobrogian border town, fortified against the Helvetii tribe, when the Romans took it in 121 BC. It became Christian under the Late Roman Empire, and acquired its first bishop in the 5th century, having been connected to the Bishopric of Vienne in the 4th.

In the Middle Ages, Geneva was ruled by a count under the Holy Roman Empire until the late 14th century, when it was granted a charter giving it a high degree of self-governance. Around this time, the House of Savoy came to at least nominally dominate the city. In the 15th century, an oligarchic republican government emerged with the creation of the Grand Council. In the first half of the 16th century, the Protestant Reformation reached the city, causing religious strife, during which Savoy rule was thrown off and Geneva allied itself with the Swiss Confederacy.
In 1541, with Protestantism on the rise, John Calvin, the Protestant Reformer and proponent of Calvinism, became the spiritual leader of the city and established the Republic of Geneva. By the 18th century, Geneva had come under the influence of Catholic France, which cultivated the city as its own. France tended to be at odds with the ordinary townsfolk, which inspired the failed Geneva Revolution of 1782, an attempt to win representation in the government for men of modest means. In 1798, revolutionary France under the Directory annexed Geneva. At the end of the Napoleonic Wars, on 1June 1814, Geneva was admitted to the Swiss Confederation. In 1907, the separation of Church and State was adopted. Geneva flourished in the 19th and 20th centuries, becoming the seat of many international organizations.

Geography

Topography

Geneva is located at 46°12' North, 6°09' East, at the south-western end of Lake Geneva, where the Rhône flows out. It is surrounded by three mountain chains, each belonging to the Jura: the Jura main range lies north-westward, the Vuache southward, and the Salève south-eastward.

The canton has only a  border with the rest of Switzerland. Of  of border, 103 are shared with France, the Département de l'Ain to the north and west and the Département de la Haute-Savoie to the south and east.

Of the land in the city, or 1.5%, is used for agricultural purposes, while , or 3.1%, is forested.

Of the built up area, industrial buildings made up 3.4%, housing and buildings made up 46.2% and transportation infrastructure 25.8%, while parks, green belts and sports fields made up 15.7%. Of the agricultural land, 0.3% is used for growing crops. Of the water in the municipality, 0.2% is composed of lakes and 2.9% is rivers and streams.

This rock was chosen by General Guillaume Henri Dufour as the reference point for surveying in Switzerland. The second main river of Geneva is the Arve, which flows into the Rhône just west of the city centre. Mont Blanc can be seen from Geneva and is an hour's drive from the city.

Climate

The climate of Geneva is a temperate climate, more specifically an oceanic climate (Köppen climate classification: Cfb). Winters are cool, usually with light frosts at night and thawing conditions during the day. Summers are relatively warm. Precipitation is adequate and is relatively well-distributed throughout the year, although autumn is slightly wetter than other seasons. Ice storms near Lac Léman are normal in the winter: Geneva can be affected by the Bise, a north-easterly wind. This can lead to severe icing in winter.

In summer, many people swim in the lake and patronise public beaches such as Genève Plage and the Bains des Pâquis. The city, in certain years, receives snow during colder months. The nearby mountains are subject to substantial snowfall and are suitable for skiing. Many world-renowned ski resorts such as Verbier and Crans-Montana are less than three hours away by car. Mont Salève, just across the border in France, dominates the southerly view from the city centre, and Mont Blanc, the highest of the Alpine range, is visible from most of the city, towering high above Chamonix, which, along with Morzine, Le Grand Bornand, La Clusaz, and resorts of the Grand Massif such as Samoens, Morillon, and Flaine, are the closest French skiing destinations to Geneva.

During the years 2000–2009, the mean yearly temperature was 11 °C and the mean number of sunshine-hours per year was 2003.

Politics

Coat of arms

Administrative divisions

The city is divided into eight quartiers, or districts, sometimes composed of several neighbourhoods. On the left bank are: (1) Jonction, (2) Centre, Plainpalais, and Acacias; (3) Eaux-Vives; and (4) Champel. The right bank includes: (1) Saint-Jean and Charmilles; (2) Servette and Petit-Saconnex; (3) Grottes and Saint-Gervais; and (4) Paquis and Nations.

Government

The Administrative Council (Conseil administratif) constitutes the executive government of the city of Geneva and operates as a collegiate authority. It is composed of five councilors, each presiding over a department. The president of the executive department acts as mayor (la maire/le maire). In the governmental year 2021–2022, the Administrative Council is presided over by Madame la maire de Genève Frédérique Perler. Departmental tasks, coordination measures and implementation of laws decreed by the Municipal Council are carried out by the Administrative Council. Elections for the Administrative Council are held every five years. The current term of (la législature) is from 1June 2020 to 31May 2025. The delegates are elected by means of a system of Majorz. The mayor and vice change each year, while the heads of the other departments are assigned by the collegiate. The executive body holds its meetings in the Palais Eynard, near the Parc des Bastions.

, Geneva's Administrative Council is made up of two representatives each of the Social Democratic Party (PS) and the Green Party (PES), and one member of the Christian Democratic Party (PDC). This gives the left-wing parties four out of the five seats and, for the first time in history, a female majority. The last election was held on 15March/5April 2020. Except for the mayor, all other councillors have been elected for the first time.

Parliament

The Municipal Council (Conseil municipal) holds legislative power. It is made up of 80 members, with elections held every five years. The Municipal Council makes regulations and by-laws that are executed by the Administrative Council and the administration. The delegates are selected by means of a system of proportional representation with a seven percent threshold.
The sessions of the Municipal Council are public. Unlike members of the Administrative Council, members of the Municipal Council are not politicians by profession, and they are paid a fee based on their attendance. Any resident of Geneva allowed to vote can be elected as a member of the Municipal Council. The Council holds its meetings in the Town Hall (Hôtel de Ville), in the old city.

The last election of the Municipal Council was held on 15March 2020 for the (législature) of 2020–2025. Currently, the Municipal Council consists of: 19 members of the Social Democratic Party (PS), 18 Green Party (PES), 14 Les Libéraux-Radicaux (PLR), 8 Christian Democratic People's Party (PDC); 7 Geneva Citizens' Movement (MCG), 7 Ensemble à Gauche (an alliance of the left parties PST-POP (Parti Suisse du Travail – Parti Ouvrier et Populaire) and solidaritéS), 6 Swiss People's Party (UDC).

Elections

National Council
In the 2019 federal election for the Swiss National Council the most popular party was the Green Party which received 26% (+14.6) of the vote. The next seven most popular parties were the PS (17.9%, -5.9), PLR (15.1%, -2.4), the UDC (12.6%, -3.7), the PdA/solidaritéS (10%, +1.3), the PDC (5.4%, -5.3), the pvl (5%, +2.9), and MCR (4.9%, -2.7). In the federal election a total of 34,319 votes were cast, and the voter turnout was 39.6%.

In the 2015 federal election for the Swiss National Council the most popular party was the PS which received 23.8% of the vote. The next five most popular parties were the PLR (17.6%), the UDC (16.3%), the Green Party (11.4%), the PDC (10.7%), and the solidaritéS (8.8%). In the federal election a total of 36,490 votes were cast, and the voter turnout was 44.1%.

Metropolitan cooperation
The city centre of Geneva is located only  from the border of France. As a result, the urban area and the metropolitan area largely extend across the border on French territory. Due to the small size of the municipality of Geneva and extension of the urban area over an international border, official bodies of transnational cooperation were developed as early as the 1970s to manage the cross-border Greater Geneva area at a metropolitan level.

In 1973, a Franco-Swiss agreement created the Comité régional franco-genevois ("Franco-Genevan Regional Committee", CRFG in French). In 1997 an 'Urban planning charter' of the CRFG defined for the first time a planning territory called agglomération franco-valdo-genevoise ("Franco-Vaud-Genevan urban area"). 2001 saw the creation of a Comité stratégique de développement des transports publics régionaux ("Strategic Committee for the Development of Regional Public Transports", DTPR in French), a committee which adopted in 2003 a 'Charter for Public Transports', first step in the development of a metropolitan, cross-border commuter rail network (see Léman Express).

In 2004, a public transnational body called Projet d’agglomération franco-valdo-genevois ("Franco-Vaud-Genevan urban area project") was created to serve as the main body of metropolitan cooperation for the planning territory defined in 1997, with more local French councils taking part in this new public body than in the CRFG created in 1973. Finally in 2012 the Projet d’agglomération franco-valdo-genevois was renamed Grand Genève ("Greater Geneva"), and the following year it was transformed into a Local Grouping of Transnational Cooperation (GLCT in French), a public entity under Swiss law, which now serves as the executive body of the Grand Genève.

The Grand Genève GLCT is made up of the Canton of Geneva, the Nyon District (in the canton of Vaud), and the Pôle métropolitain du Genevois français (literally "Metropolitan hub of the French Genevan territory"), this last one a federation of eight French intercommunal councils in Ain and Haute-Savoie. The Grand Genève GLCT extends over 
and had a population of 1,025,316 in Jan. 2019 (Swiss estimates and French census), 58.5% of them living on Swiss territory, and 41.5% on French territory.

International relations
Geneva does not have any sister relationships with other cities. It declares itself related to the entire world.

Demographics

Population

The city of Geneva is at the centre of the Geneva metropolitan area, a Functional Urban Area (as per Eurostat methodology) which extends over Swiss territory (entire Canton of Geneva and part of the canton of Vaud) and French territory (parts of the departments of Ain and Haute-Savoie). The Geneva Functional Urban Area covers a land area of  (24.2% in Switzerland, 75.8% in France) and had 1,044,766 inhabitants in Jan. 2020 (Swiss estimates and French census), 58.0% of them on Swiss territory and 42.0% on French territory.

The Geneva metropolitan area is one of the fastest growing in Europe. Its population rose from 888,651 in Jan. 2009 to 1,044,766 in Jan. 2020, which means the metropolitan area registered a population growth rate of +1.48% per year during those 11 years. Growth is higher in the French part of the metropolitan area (+1.93% per year between 2009 and 2020) than in the Swiss part (+1.17% per year between 2009 and 2020), as Geneva attracts many French commuters due to high Swiss salaries and a favorable Franco-Swiss tax regime for French residents working in Switzerland.

The official language of Geneva (both the city and the canton) is French. English is also common due to the high number of anglophone immigrants and foreigners working in international institutions and in the bank sector. , 128,622 or 72.3% of the population speaks French as a first language, with English being the second most common (7,853 or 4.4%) language. 7,462 inhabitants speak Spanish (or 4.2%), 7,320 speak Italian (4.1%), 7,050 speak German (4.0%) and 113 people who speak Romansh. As a result of immigration flows in the 1960s and 1980s, Portuguese is also spoken by a considerable proportion of the population.

In the city of Geneva, 48% of the population are resident foreign nationals. For a list of the largest groups of foreign residents see the cantonal overview. Over the last 10 years (1999–2009), the population has changed at a rate of 7.2%; a rate of 3.4% due to migration and at a rate of 3.4% due to births and deaths.

, the gender distribution of the population was 47.8% male and 52.2% female. The population was made up of 46,284 Swiss men (24.2% of the population) and 45,127 (23.6%) non-Swiss men. There were 56,091 Swiss women (29.3%) and 43,735 (22.9%) non-Swiss women.  approximately 24.3% of the population of the municipality were born in Geneva and lived there in 200043,296. A further 11,757 or 6.6% who were born in the same canton, while 27,359 or 15.4% were born elsewhere in Switzerland, and 77,893 or 43.8% were born outside of Switzerland.

In , there were 1,147 live births to Swiss citizens and 893 births to non-Swiss citizens, and in the same time span there were 1,114 deaths of Swiss citizens and 274 non-Swiss citizen deaths. Ignoring immigration and emigration, the population of Swiss citizens increased by 33, while the foreign population increased by 619. There were 465 Swiss men and 498 Swiss women who emigrated from Switzerland. At the same time, there were 2933 non-Swiss men and 2662 non-Swiss women who immigrated from another country to Switzerland. The total Swiss population change in 2008 (from all sources, including moves across municipal borders) was an increase of 135 and the non-Swiss population increased by 3181 people. This represents a population growth rate of 1.8%.

, children and teenagers (0–19 years old) make up 18.2% of the population, while adults (20–64 years old) make up 65.8% and seniors (over 64 years old) make up 16%.

, there were 78,666 people who were single and never married in the municipality. There were 74,205 married individuals, 10,006 widows or widowers and 15,087 individuals who are divorced.

, there were 86,231 private households in the municipality, and an average of 1.9 persons per household. There were 44,373 households that consist of only one person and 2,549 households with five or more people. Out of a total of 89,269 households that answered this question, 49.7% were households made up of just one person and there were 471 adults who lived with their parents. Of the rest of the households, there are 17,429 married couples without children, 16,607 married couples with children. There were 5,499 single parents with a child or children. There were 1,852 households that were made up of unrelated people and 3,038 households that were made up of some sort of institution or another collective housing.

, there were 743 single family homes (or 10.6% of the total) out of a total of 6,990 inhabited buildings. There were 2,758 multi-family buildings (39.5%), along with 2,886 multi-purpose buildings that were mostly used for housing (41.3%) and 603 other use buildings (commercial or industrial) that also had some housing (8.6%). Of the single family homes, 197 were built before 1919, while 20 were built between 1990 and 2000. The greatest number of single family homes (277) were built between 1919 and 1945.

, there were 101,794 apartments in the municipality. The most common apartment size was 3 rooms of which there were 27,084. There were 21,889 single room apartments and 11,166 apartments with five or more rooms. Of these apartments, a total of 85,330 apartments (83.8% of the total) were permanently occupied, while 13,644 apartments (13.4%) were seasonally occupied and 2,820 apartments (2.8%) were empty. , the construction rate of new housing units was 1.3 new units per 1000 residents.

, the average price to rent an average apartment in Geneva was 1163.30 Swiss francs (CHF) per month (US$930, £520, €740 approx. exchange rate from 2003). The average rate for a one-room apartment was 641.60 CHF (US$510, £290, €410), a two-room apartment was about 874.46 CHF (US$700, £390, €560), a three-room apartment was about 1126.37 CHF (US$900, £510, €720) and a six or more room apartment cost an average of 2691.07 CHF (US$2150, £1210, €1720). The average apartment price in Geneva was 104.2% of the national average of 1116 CHF. The vacancy rate for the municipality, was 0.25%.

In June 2011, the average price of an apartment in and around Geneva was 13,681 CHF per square metre. The average can be as high as 17,589 Swiss francs (CHF) per square metre for a luxury apartment and as low as 9,847 Swiss francs (CHF) for an older or basic apartment. For houses in and around Geneva, the average price was 11,595 Swiss francs (CHF) per square metre (June 2011), with a lowest price per square metre of 4,874 Swiss francs (CHF), and a maximum price of 21,966 Swiss francs (CHF).

Historical population 
William Monter calculates that the city's total population was 12,000–13,000 in 1550, doubling to over 25,000 by 1560.

The historical population is given in the following chart:

Religion 

The  recorded 66,491 residents (37.4% of the population) as Catholic, while 41,289 people (23.20%) belonged to no church or were agnostic or atheist, 24,105 (13.5%) belonged to the Swiss Reformed Church, and 8,698 (4.89%) were Muslim. There were also 3,959 members of an Orthodox church (2.22%), 220 individuals (or about 0.12% of the population) who belonged to the Christian Catholic Church of Switzerland, 2,422 (1.36%) who belonged to another Christian church, and 2,601 people (1.46%) who were Jewish. There were 707 individuals who were Buddhist, 474 who were Hindu and 423 who belonged to another church. 26,575 respondents (14.93%) did not answer the question.

According to 2012 statistics by Swiss Bundesamt für Statistik 49.2% of the population were Christian, (34.2% Catholic, 8.8% Swiss Reformed (organized in the Protestant Church of Geneva) and 6.2% other Christians, mostly other Protestants), 38% of Genevans were non-religious, 6.1% were Muslim and 1.6% were Jews.

Geneva has historically been considered a Protestant city and was known as the Protestant Rome due to it being the base of John Calvin, William Farel, Theodore Beza and other Protestant reformers. Over the past century, substantial immigration from France and other predominantly Catholic countries, as well as general secularization, has changed its religious landscape. As a result, three times as many Roman Catholics as Protestants lived in the city in 2000, while a large number of residents were members of neither group. Geneva forms part of the Roman Catholic Diocese of Lausanne, Geneva and Fribourg.

The World Council of Churches and the Lutheran World Federation both have their headquarters at the Ecumenical Centre in Grand-Saconnex, Geneva. The World Communion of Reformed Churches, a worldwide organization of Presbyterian, Continental Reformed, Congregational and other Calvinist churches gathering more than 80 million people around the world was based here from 1948 until 2013. The executive committee of the World Communion of Reformed Churches voted in 2012 to move its offices to Hanover, Germany, citing the high costs of running the ecumenical organization in Geneva, Switzerland. The move was completed in 2013. Likewise, the Conference of European Churches have moved their headquarters from Geneva to Brussels.

"Protestant Rome"

Prior to the Protestant Reformation the city was de jure and de facto Catholic. Reaction to the new movement varied across Switzerland. John Calvin went to Geneva in 1536 after William Farel encouraged him to do so. In Geneva, the Catholic bishop had been obliged to seek exile in 1532. Geneva became a stronghold of Calvinism. Some of the tenets created there influenced Protestantism as a whole. St. Pierre Cathedral was where Calvin and his Protestant reformers preached. It constituted the epicentre of the newly developing Protestant thought that would later become known as the Reformed tradition. Many prominent Reformed theologians operated there, including William Farel and Theodore Beza, Calvin's successor who progressed Reformed thought after his death.

Geneva was a shelter for Calvinists, but at the same time it persecuted Roman Catholics and others considered heretics. The case of Michael Servetus, an early Nontrinitarian, is notable. Condemned by both Catholics and Protestants alike, he was arrested in Geneva and burnt at the stake as a heretic by order of the city's Protestant governing council. John Calvin and his followers denounced him, and possibly contributed to his sentence.

In 1802, during its annexation to France under Napoleon I, the Diocese of Geneva was united with the Diocese of Chambéry, but the 1814 Congress of Vienna and the 1816 Treaty of Turin stipulated that in the territories transferred to a now considerably extended Geneva, the Catholic religion was to be protected and that no changes were to be made in existing conditions without an agreement with the Holy See. Napoleon's common policy was to emancipate Catholics in Protestant-majority areas, and the other way around, as well as emancipating Jews. In 1819, the city of Geneva and 20 parishes were united to the Diocese of Lausanne by Pope Pius VII and in 1822, the non-Swiss territory was made into the Diocese of Annecy. A variety of concord with the civil authorities came as a result of the separation of church and state, enacted with strong Catholic support in 1907.

Crime

In 2014 the incidence of crimes listed in the Swiss Criminal Code in Geneva was 143.9 per thousand residents. During the same period the rate of drug crimes was 33.6 per thousand residents. The rate of violations of immigration, visa and work permit laws was 35.7 per thousand residents.

Cityscape

Heritage sites of national significance 
There are 82 buildings or sites in Geneva that are listed as Swiss heritage sites of national significance, and the entire old city of Geneva is part of the Inventory of Swiss Heritage Sites.

Religious buildings: Cathedral St-Pierre et Chapel des Macchabés, Notre-Dame Church, Russian church, St-Germain Church, Temple de la Fusterie, Temple de l'Auditoire

Civic buildings: Former Arsenal and Archives of the City of Genève, Former Crédit Lyonnais, Former Hôtel Buisson, Former Hôtel du Résident de France et Bibliothèque de la Société de lecture de Genève, Former école des arts industriels, Archives d'État de Genève (Annexe), Bâtiment des forces motrices, Bibliothèque de Genève, Library juive de Genève «Gérard Nordmann», Cabinet des estampes, Centre d'Iconographie genevoise, Collège Calvin, École Geisendorf, University Hospital of Geneva (HUG), Hôtel de Ville et tour Baudet, Immeuble Clarté at Rue Saint-Laurent 2 and 4, Immeubles House Rotonde at Rue Charles-Giron 11–19, Immeubles at Rue Beauregard 2, 4, 6, 8, Immeubles at Rue de la Corraterie 10–26, Immeubles at Rue des Granges 2–6, Immeuble at Rue des Granges 8, Immeubles at Rue des Granges 10 and 12, Immeuble at Rue des Granges 14, Immeuble and Former Armory at Rue des Granges 16, Immeubles at Rue Pierre Fatio 7 and 9, House de Saussure at Rue de la Cité 24, House Des arts du Grütli at Rue du Général-Dufour 16, House Royale et les deux immeubles à côté at Quai Gustave Ador 44–50, Tavel House at Rue du Puits-St-Pierre 6, Turrettini House at Rue de l'Hôtel-de-Ville 8 and 10, Brunswick Monument, Palais de Justice, Palais de l'Athénée, Palais des Nations with library and archives of the SDN and ONU, Palais Eynard et Archives de la ville de Genève, Palais Wilson, Parc des Bastions avec Mur des Réformateurs, Place de Neuve et Monument du Général Dufour, Pont de la Machine, Pont sur l'Arve, Poste du Mont-Blanc, Quai du Mont-Blanc, Quai et Hôtel des Bergues, Quai Général Guisan and English Gardens, Quai Gustave-Ador and Jet d'eau, Télévision Suisse Romande, University of Geneva, Victoria Hall.

Archeological sites:
Foundation Baur and Museum of the arts d'Extrême-Orient, Parc et campagne de la Grange and Library (neolithic shore settlement/Roman villa), Bronze Age shore settlement of Plonjon, Temple de la Madeleine archeological site, Temple Saint-Gervais archeological site, Old City with Celtic, Roman and medieval villages.

Museums, theaters, and other cultural sites: Conservatoire de musique at Place Neuve 5, Conservatoire et Jardin botaniques, Fonds cantonal d'art contemporain, Ile Rousseau and statue, Institut et Musée Voltaire with Library and Archives, Mallet House and Museum international de la Réforme, Musée Ariana, Museum of Art and History, Museum d'art moderne et contemporain, Museum d'ethnographie, Museum of the International Red Cross, Musée Rath, Natural History Museum, Plainpalais Commune Auditorium, Pitoëff Theatre, Villa Bartholoni at the Museum of History and Science.

International organizations: International Labour Organization (ILO), International Committee of the Red Cross, United Nations High Commissioner for Refugees (UNHCR), World Meteorological Organization, World Trade Organization, International Telecommunication Union, World YMCA.

Society and culture

Media 
The city's main newspaper is the daily Tribune de Genève, with a readership of about 187,000. Le Courrier mainly focuses on Geneva. Both Le Temps (headquartered in Geneva) and Le Matin are widely read in Geneva, but cover the whole of Romandy.

Geneva is the main media center for French-speaking Switzerland. It is the headquarters for the numerous French language radio and television networks of the Swiss Broadcasting Corporation, known collectively as Radio Télévision Suisse. While both networks cover the whole of Romandy, special programs related to Geneva are sometimes broadcast on some of the local radio frequencies. Other local radio stations broadcast from the city, including YesFM (FM 91.8 MHz), Radio Cité (non-commercial radio, FM 92.2 MHz), OneFM (FM 107.0 MHz, also broadcast in Vaud), and World Radio Switzerland (FM 88.4 MHz). Léman Bleu is a local TV channel, founded in 1996 and distributed by cable. Due to the proximity to France, many French television channels are also available.

Traditions and customs 
Geneva observes Jeûne genevois on the first Thursday following the first Sunday in September. By local tradition, this commemorates the date news of the St. Bartholomew's Day massacre of Huguenots reached Geneva.

Geneva celebrates L'Escalade on the weekend nearest 12 December, celebrating the defeat of the surprise attack of troops sent by Charles Emmanuel I, Duke of Savoy during the night of 11–12 December 1602. Festive traditions include chocolate cauldrons filled with vegetable-shaped marzipan treats and the Escalade procession on horseback in seventeenth century armour. Geneva has also been organizing a 'Course de l'Escalade', which means 'Climbing Race'. This race takes place in Geneva's Old Town, and has been popular across all ages. Non-competitive racers dress up in fancy costumes, while walking in the race.

Since 1818, a particular chestnut tree has been used as the official "herald of the spring" in Geneva. The sautier (secretary of the Parliament of the Canton of Geneva) observes the tree and notes the day of arrival of the first bud. While this event has no practical effect, the sautier issues a formal press release and the local newspaper will usually mention the news.

As this is one of the world's oldest records of a plant's reaction to climatic conditions, researchers have been interested to note that the first bud has been appearing earlier and earlier in the year. During the 19th century many dates were in March or April. In recent years, they have usually been in late February (sometimes earlier). In 2002, the first bud appeared unusually early, on 7 February, and then again on 29 December of the same year. The following year, one of the hottest years recorded in Europe, was a year with no bud. In 2008, the first bud also appeared early, on 19 February.

Music and festivals 

The opera house, the Grand Théâtre de Genève, which officially opened in 1876, was partly destroyed by a fire in 1951 and reopened in 1962. It has the largest stage in Switzerland. It features opera and dance performances, recitals, concerts and, occasionally, theatre. The Victoria Hall is used for classical music concerts. It is the home of the Orchestre de la Suisse Romande.

Every summer the Fêtes de Genève (Geneva Festival) are organised in Geneva. According to Radio Télévision Suisse in 2013 hundreds of thousands of people came to Geneva to see the annual hour-long grand firework display of the Fêtes de Genève.

An annual music festival takes place in June. Groups of artists perform in different parts of the city. In 2016 the festival celebrated its 25th anniversary.

Further annual festivals are the Fête de l'Olivier, a festival of Arabic music, organized by the ICAM since 1980, and the Genevan Brass Festival, founded by Christophe Sturzenegger in 2010.

Education 

The Canton of Geneva's public school system has écoles primaires (ages 4–12) and cycles d'orientation (ages 12–15). Students can leave school at 15, but secondary education is provided by collèges (ages 15–19), the oldest of which is the Collège Calvin, which could be considered one of the oldest public schools in the world, écoles de culture générale (15–18/19) and the écoles professionnelles (15–18/19). The écoles professionnelles offer full-time courses and part-time study as part of an apprenticeship. Geneva also has a number of private schools.

In 2011 89,244 (37.0%) of the population had completed non-mandatory upper secondary education, and 107,060 or (44.3%) had completed additional higher education (either university or a Fachhochschule). Of the 107,060 who completed tertiary schooling, 32.5% were Swiss men, 31.6% were Swiss women, 18.1% were non-Swiss men and 17.8% were non-Swiss women.

During the 2011–2012 school year, there were a total of 92,311 students in the Geneva school system (primary to university). The education system in the Canton of Geneva has eight years of primary school, with 32,716 students. The secondary school program consists of three lower, obligatory years of schooling, followed by three to five years of optional, advanced study. There were 13,146 lower-secondary students who attended schools in Geneva. There were 10,486 upper-secondary students from the municipality along with 10,330 students who were in a professional, non-university track program. An additional 11,797 students were attending private schools.

Geneva is home to the University of Geneva where approximately 16,500 students are regularly enrolled. In 1559 John Calvin founded the Geneva Academy, a theological and humanist seminary. In the 19th century the academy lost its ecclesiastic links and in 1873, with the addition of a medical faculty, it became the University of Geneva. In 2011 it was ranked  European university.

The Graduate Institute of International and Development Studies was among the first academic institutions in the world to teach international relations. It is one of Europe's most prestigious institutions, offering MA and PhD programmes in anthropology and sociology, law, political science, history, economics, international affairs, and development studies.

The oldest international school in the world is the International School of Geneva, founded in 1924 along with the League of Nations. The Geneva School of Diplomacy and International Relations is a private, for-profit university in the grounds of the Château de Penthes.

CERN (the European Organization for Nuclear Research) is probably the best known of Geneva's educational and research facilities, most recently for the Large Hadron Collider. Founded in 1954, CERN was one of Europe's first joint ventures and has developed as the world's largest particle physics laboratory. Physicists from around the world travel to CERN to research matter and explore the fundamental forces and materials that form the universe.

Geneva is home to five major libraries, the Bibliothèques municipales Genève, the Haute école de travail social, the Institut d'études sociales, the Haute école de santé, the École d'ingénieurs de Genève and the Haute école d'art et de design. There were  877,680 books or other media in the libraries, and in the same year 1,798,980 items were loaned.

Economy 
Geneva's economy is largely service-driven and closely linked to the rest of the canton. The city is one of the global leaders in financial centres. Three main sectors dominate the financial sector: commodity trading; trade finance, and wealth management.

Around a third of the world's free traded oil, sugar, grains and oil seeds is traded in Geneva. Approximately 22% of the world's cotton is traded in the Lake Geneva region. Other major commodities traded in the canton include steel, electricity, or coffee. Large trading companies have their regional or global headquarters in the canton, such as Bunge, Cargill, Vitol, Gunvor, BNP Paribas, Trafigura or Mercuria Energy Group, in addition to being home to the world's largest shipping company, Mediterranean Shipping Company. Commodity trading is sustained by a strong trade finance sector, with large banks such as BCGE, BCP, BNP Paribas, BCV, Crédit Agricole, Credit Suisse, ING, Société Générale, and UBS, all having their headquarters in the area for this business.

Wealth management is dominated by non-publicly listed banks and private banks, particularly Pictet, Lombard Odier, Edmond de Rothschild Group, Union Bancaire Privée, Mirabaud Group, Dukascopy Bank, Bordier & Cie, Banque SYZ, or REYL & Cie. In addition, the canton is home to the largest concentration of foreign-owned banks in Switzerland, such as HSBC Private Bank, JPMorgan Chase, or Arab Bank.

Behind the financial sector, the next largest major economic sector is watchmaking, dominated by luxury firms Rolex, Richemont, Patek Philippe, Piaget, Roger Dubuis, and others, whose factories are concentrated in the Les Acacias neighbourhood, as well as the neighbouring municipalities of Plan-les-Ouates, Satigny, and Meyrin.

Trade finance, wealth management, and watchmaking, approximately contribute two thirds of the corporate tax paid in the canton

Other large multinationals are also headquartered in the city and canton, such as Firmenich (in Satigny), and Givaudan (in Vernier), the world's two largest manufacturers of flavours, fragrances and active cosmetic ingredients; SGS, the world's largest inspection, verification, testing and certification services company; Temenos, a large banking software provider; or the local headquarters for Procter & Gamble, Japan Tobacco International, or L'Oréal (in Vernier).

Although they do not directly contribute to the local economy, the city of Geneva is also host to the world's largest concentration of international organisations and UN agencies, such as the Red Cross, the World Health Organization, the World Trade Organization, the International Telecommunication Union, the World Intellectual Property Organization, the World Meteorological Organization, and the International Labour Organization, as well as the European headquarters of the United Nations.

Its international mindedness, well-connected airport, and centrality in the continent, also make Geneva a good destination for congresses and trade fairs, of which the largest is the Geneva Motor Show held in Palexpo.

Agriculture is commonplace in the hinterlands of Geneva, particularly wheat and wine. Despite its relatively small size, the canton produces around 10% of the Swiss wine and has the highest vineyard density in the country. The largest strains grown in Geneva are gamay, chasselas, pinot noir, gamaret, and chardonnay.

, Geneva had an unemployment rate of 3.9%. , there were five people employed in the primary economic sector and about three businesses involved in this sector. 9,783 people were employed in the secondary sector and there were 1,200 businesses in this sector. 134,429 people were employed in the tertiary sector, with 12,489 businesses in this sector. There were 91,880 residents of the municipality who were employed in some capacity, with women making up 47.7% of the workforce.

, the total number of full-time equivalent jobs was 124,185. The number of jobs in the primary sector was four, all of which were in agriculture. The number of jobs in the secondary sector was 9,363 of which 4,863 or (51.9%) were in manufacturing and 4,451 (47.5%) were in construction. The number of jobs in the tertiary sector was 114,818. In the tertiary sector; 16,573 or 14.4% were in wholesale or retail sales or the repair of motor vehicles, 3,474 or 3.0% were in the movement and storage of goods, 9,484 or 8.3% were in a hotel or restaurant, 4,544 or 4.0% were in the information industry, 20,982 or 18.3% were the insurance or financial industry, 12,177 or 10.6% were technical professionals or scientists, 10,007 or 8.7% were in education and 15,029 or 13.1% were in health care.

, there were 95,190 workers who commuted into the municipality and 25,920 workers who commuted away. The municipality is a net importer of workers, with about 3.7 workers entering the municipality for every one leaving. About 13.8% of the workforce coming into Geneva are coming from outside Switzerland, while 0.4% of the locals commute out of Switzerland for work. Of the working population, 38.2% used public transportation to get to work, and 30.6% used a private car.

Sport 
Ice hockey is one of the most popular sports in Geneva. Geneva is home to Genève-Servette HC, which plays in the National League (NL). They play their home games in the 7,135-seat Patinoire des Vernets. In 2008, 2010 and 2021 the team made it to the league finals but lost to the ZSC Lions, SC Bern and EV Zug respectively. The team was by far the most popular one in both the city and the canton of Geneva, drawing three times more spectators than the football team in 2017. Since the return of Servette FC in the Swiss Super League, however, both teams have similar attendance numbers.

The town is home to Servette FC, a football club founded in 1890 and named after a borough on the right bank of the Rhône. It is the most successful football club in Romandy, and the third in Switzerland overall, with 17 league titles and 7 Swiss Cups. The home of Servette FC is the 30,000-seat Stade de Genève. Servette FC plays in the Credit Suisse Super League. Étoile Carouge FC and Urania Genève Sport also play in the city.

Geneva is home to the basketball team Lions de Genève, 2013 and 2015 champions of the Swiss Basketball League. The team plays its home games in the Pavilion des Sports.

Geneva Jets Australian Football Club have been playing Australian Football in the AFL Switzerland league since 2019.

Infrastructure

Transportation 

The city is served by the Geneva Airport. It is connected by Geneva Airport railway station to both the Swiss Federal Railways network and the French SNCF network, including links to Paris, Lyon, Marseille and Montpellier by TGV. Geneva is connected to the motorway systems of both Switzerland (A1 motorway) and France.

Public transport by bus, trolleybus or tram is provided by Transports Publics Genevois. In addition to an extensive coverage of the city centre, the network extends to most of the municipalities of the Canton, with a few lines reaching into France. Public transport by boat is provided by the Mouettes Genevoises, which link the two banks of the lake within the city, and by the Compagnie Générale de Navigation sur le lac Léman which serves more distant destinations such as Nyon, Yvoire, Thonon, Évian, Lausanne and Montreux using both modern diesel vessels and vintage paddle steamers.

Trains operated by Swiss Federal Railways connect the airport to the main station of Cornavin in six minutes. Regional train services are being developed towards Coppet and Bellegarde. At the city limits two new railway stations have been opened since 2002: Genève-Sécheron (close to the UN and the Botanical Gardens) and Lancy-Pont-Rouge.

In 2011 work started on the CEVA rail (Cornavin – Eaux-Vives – Annemasse) project, first planned in 1884, which will connect Cornavin with the Cantonal hospital, Eaux-Vives railway station and Annemasse, in France. The link between the main railway station and the classification yard of La Praille already exists; from there, the line runs mostly underground to the Hospital and Eaux-Vives, where it links to the existing line to France. The line fully opened in December 2019, as part of the Léman Express regional rail network.

In May 2013, the demonstrator electric bus system with a capacity of 133 passengers commenced between Geneva Airport and Palexpo. The project aims to introduce a new system of mass transport with electric "flash" recharging of the buses at selected stops while passengers are disembarking and embarking.

Taxis in Geneva can be difficult to find, and may need to be booked in advance, especially in the early morning or at peak hours. Taxis can refuse to take babies and children because of seating legislation.

An ambitious project to close 200 streets in the centre of Geneva to cars was approved by the Geneva cantonal authorities in 2010 and was planned to be implemented over a span of four years (2010–2014), though , work on the project has yet to be started.

Utilities 

Water, natural gas and electricity are provided to the municipalities of the Canton of Geneva by the state-owned Services Industriels de Genève, known as SIG. Most of the drinking water (80%) is extracted from the lake; the remaining 20% is provided by groundwater, originally formed by infiltration from the Arve. 30% of the Canton's electricity needs is locally produced, mainly by three hydroelectric dams on the Rhône (Seujet, Verbois and Chancy-Pougny). In addition, 13% of the electricity produced in the Canton is from the burning of waste at the waste incineration facility of Les Cheneviers. The remaining needs (57%) are covered by imports from other cantons in Switzerland or other European countries; SIG buys only electricity produced by renewable methods, and in particular does not use electricity produced using nuclear reactors or fossil fuels. Natural gas is available in the City of Geneva, as well as in about two-thirds of the municipalities of the canton, and is imported from Western Europe by the Swiss company Gaznat. SIG also provides telecommunication facilities to carriers, service providers and large enterprises. From 2003 to 2005, "Voisin, voisine" a fibre to the Home pilot project with a triple play offering was launched to test the end-user market in the Charmilles district.

International organisations 

Geneva is the European headquarters of the United Nations, in the Palace of Nations building, up the hill from the headquarters of the former League of Nations. Several agencies are headquartered in Geneva, including the United Nations High Commissioner for Refugees, the UN Office of the High Commissioner for Human Rights, the World Health Organization, the International Labour Organization, International Telecommunication Union, the International Baccalaureate Organization and the World Intellectual Property Organization.

Apart from the UN agencies, Geneva hosts many inter-governmental organizations, such as the World Trade Organization, the South Centre, the World Meteorological Organization, the World Economic Forum, the International Organization for Migration, the International Federation of Red Cross and Red Crescent Societies and the International Committee of the Red Cross.

The Maison de la Paix building hosts the three Geneva centres supported by the Swiss Confederation: the International Centre for Humanitarian Demining, the Centre for the Democratic Control of Armed Forces and the Geneva Centre for Security Policy, as well as other organisations active in the field of peace, international affairs and sustainable development.

Organizations on the European level include the European Broadcasting Union (EBU) and CERN (the European Organization for Nuclear Research) which is the world's largest particle physics laboratory.

The Geneva Environment Network (GEN) publishes the Geneva Green Guide, an extensive listing of Geneva-based global organisations working on environmental protection and sustainable development. A website, jointly run by the Swiss Government, the World Business Council for Sustainable Development, the United Nations Environment Programme and the International Union for Conservation of Nature, includes accounts of how NGOs, business, government and the UN cooperate. By doing so, it attempts to explain why Geneva has been picked by so many NGOs and UN bodies as their headquarters' location.

The World Organization of the Scout Movement and the World Scout Bureau Central Office are headquartered in Geneva.

Notable people

A–C 

 Alfredo Aceto (born 1991), a visual artist
 Gustave Ador (1845–1928), statesman, President of the Red Cross (ICRC)
 David Aebischer (born 1978), ice hockey goaltender, 2001 Stanley Cup champion
 Jacques-Laurent Agasse (1767–1849), animal and landscape painter
 Jeff Agoos (born 1968), retired American soccer defender, 134 caps for the US team
 Henri-Frédéric Amiel (1821–1881), moral philosopher, poet and critic
 Gustave Amoudruz (1885–1963), sports shooter, bronze medallist at the 1920 Summer Olympics 
 Adolphe Appia (1862–1928), architect and theorist of stage lighting and décor. 
 Philip Arditti (born c. 1980), British/Jewish Sephardic theatre and television actor
 Aimé Argand (1750–1803), physicist and chemist, invented the Argand lamp
 Jean-Robert Argand (1768–1822), amateur mathematician, published the Argand diagram
 Martha Argerich (born 1941), an Argentine classical concert pianist
 John Armleder (born 1948), performance artist, painter, sculptor, critic and curator
 Germaine Aussey (1909–1979), née Agassiz, an actress of Swiss origin who settled in Geneva in 1960
 Alexandre Bardinon (born 2002), racing driver
 Pierre Bardinon (1931–2012), businessman and car collector
 Mathias Beche (born 1986), racing driver
 Jean-Luc Bideau (born 1940), film actor
 Ernest Bloch (1880–1959), US composer of Swiss origin
 Roger Bocquet (1921–1994), footballer who won 48 caps for Switzerland
 Raoul Marie Joseph Count de Boigne (1862–1949), a French sports shooter, bronze medallist at the 1908 Summer Olympics
 Caroline Boissier-Butini (1786–1836), pianist and composer
 François Bonivard (1493–1570), Geneva ecclesiastic, historian and libertine
 Charles Bonnet (1720–1793), naturalist and philosophical writer
 Jorge Luis Borges (1899–1986), Argentine short-story writer, studied at the Collège de Genève
 Marc-Théodore Bourrit (1739–1819), traveller and writer
 Nicolas Bouvier (1929–1998), writer and photographer
 Clotilde Bressler-Gianoli (1875–1912), an Italian opera singer
 Christiane Brunner (born 1947), politician, lawyer and trade union champion 
 Mickaël Buffaz (born 1979), French cyclist
 Jean-Jacques Burlamaqui (1694–1748), Genevan legal and political theorist
 Cécile Butticaz (1884–1966), engineer
 Kate Burton (born 1957), actress, the daughter of actor Richard Burton
 John Calvin (1509–1564), influential theologian, reformer
 Augustin Pyramus de Candolle (1778–1841), botanist, worked on plant classification
 Clint Capela (born 1994), professional basketball player
 Jean de Carro (1770–1857), Vienna-based physician, promoted vaccination against smallpox
 Isaac Casaubon (1559–1614), a classical scholar and philologist
 Méric Casaubon (1599–1671), son of Isaac Casaubon, a French-English classical scholar
 Mike Castro de Maria (born 1972), electronic music composer
 Jean-Jacques Challet-Venel (1811–1893), politician, on the Swiss Federal Council 1864–1872
 Alfred Edward Chalon RA (1780–1860), portrait painter
 John James Chalon RA (1778–1854), painter of landscapes, marine scenes and animal life
 Marguerite Champendal (1870–1928), first Genevan to have obtained her doctorate in medicine at the University of Geneva (1900) 
 Henri Christiné (1867–1941), French composer of sparkling, witty, jazzy musical plays
 Victor Cherbuliez (1829–1899), novelist and author
 Étienne Clavière (1735–1793), banker and politician of the French revolution
 Paulo Coelho (born 1947), Brazilian lyricist and novelist, author of The Alchemist, residing in Geneva
 Renée Colliard (born 1933), former alpine skier, gold medallist at the 1956 Winter Olympics
 Gabriel Cramer (1704–1752), Genevan mathematician

D–G 

 Maryam d'Abo (born 1960), English film and TV actress and Bond girl
 Jacques-Antoine Dassier (1715–1759), a Genevan medallist, active in London
 Michel Decastel (born 1955), football manager and midfielder, 314 club caps, 19 for Switzerland
 Jean-Denis Delétraz (born 1963), racing driver
 Louis Delétraz (born 1997), racing driver
 Jean-Louis de Lolme (1740–1806), lawyer and constitutional writer
 Jean-André Deluc (1727–1817), geologist, natural philosopher and meteorologist
 Giovanni Diodati (1576–1649), Italian Calvinist theologian and Bible translator
 Élie Ducommun (1833–1906), peace activist, 1902 Nobel Peace Prize winner 
 Armand Dufaux (1833–1941), aviation pioneer, flew the length of Lake Geneva in 1910
 Henri Dufaux (1879–1980), French-Swiss aviation pioneer, inventor, painter and politician
 Pierre Étienne Louis Dumont (1759–1829), Genevan political writer
 Henry Dunant (1828–1910), founded the Red Cross, first recipient of Nobel Peace Prize in 1901
 Emmanuel-Étienne Duvillard (1775–1832), Swiss economist
 Isabelle Eberhardt (1877–1904), Russian-Swiss explorer and travel writer
 Empress Elisabeth of Austria (1837–1898), Empress of Austria and Queen of Hungary
 Emanuele Filiberto of Savoy, Prince of Venice (born 1972), a member of the House of Savoy
 Louis Favre (1826–1879), engineer, responsible for the construction of the Gotthard Tunnel
 Philippe Favre (1961–2013), racing driver
 Henri Fazy (1842–1920), politician and historian
 Edmond Fleg, born Flegenheimer (1874–1963), a Swiss-French writer, thinker, novelist, essayist and playwright
 Ian Fleming (1908–1964), author (James Bond), studied psychology briefly in Geneva in 1931
 Sylvie Fleury (born 1961), a contemporary object artist of installation art and mixed media
 Sir Augustus Wollaston Franks KCB FRS FSA (1826–1897), English antiquary and museum administrator
 Pierre-Victor Galland (1822–1892), painter
 Albert Gallatin (1761–1849), an American politician of Genevan origin, diplomat, ethnologist and linguist
 Agénor de Gasparin (1810–1871), French statesman and author, also researched table-turning
 Valérie de Gasparin (1813–1894), woman of letters, regards freedom, equality and creativity
 François Gaussen (1790–1863), Protestant divine
 Marcel Golay (1927–2015), astronomer
 Claude Goretta (1929–2019), film director and television producer
 Emilie Gourd (1879–1946), journalist and activist for Women's suffrage in Switzerland
 Isabelle Graesslé (born 1959), theologian, feminist and former museum director, moderator of ministers and deacons at the Protestant Church of Geneva
 Kat Graham (born 1989), actress, singer, and model, she plays Bonnie Bennett in The Vampire Diaries
 Cédric Grand (born 1976), bobsledder, competed in four Winter Olympics, bronze medallist at the 2006 Winter Olympics
 Romain Grosjean (born 1986), racing driver, currently racing for Andretti Autosport in the IndyCar Series

H–M 

 Admiral of the Fleet Lord John Hay GCB (1827–1916), Royal Navy officer and politician
 Abraham Hermanjat (1862–1932), painter who worked in the Fauvist and Divisionist styles
 Germain Henri Hess (1802–1850), a Swiss-Russian chemist and doctor, formulated Hess's law 
 Hector Hodler (1887–1920), Esperantist
 Fulk Greville Howard (1773–1846), an English politician
 Jean Huber (1721–1786), a painter, silhouettiste, soldier and author
 François Huber (1750–1831), naturalist, studied the respiration of bees
 Marie Huber (1695–1753), translator, editor and author of theological works
 Pierre Jeanneret (1896–1967), architect, collaborated with his cousin Le Corbusier
 Thomas Jouannet (born 1970), actor
 Charles Journet (1891–1975), cardinal of the Roman Catholic Church
 Louis Jurine (1751–1819), physician, surgeon, naturalist and entomologist
 Sonia Kacem (born 1985), Swiss-born visual artist
 Michael Krausz (born 1942), American philosopher, an artist and orchestral conductor
 Adrien Lachenal (1849–1918), politician, Federal Council of Switzerland 1892–1899 
 François Lachenal (1918–1997), a publisher and diplomat
 Paul Lachenal (1884–1955), politician, co-founded Orchestre de la Suisse Romande
 Marie Laforêt (born 1939), a French singer and actress
 Sarah Lahbati (born 1993), actress and singer
 François Le Fort (1656–1699), first Russian Admiral
 Georges-Louis Le Sage (1724–1803), physicist, Le Sage's theory of gravitation
 Jean Leclerc (1657–1736), theologian and biblical scholar, promoted exegesis
 Henri Leconte (born 1963), former French professional tennis player, men's singles finalist, French Open 1988
 Philippe Le Royer (1816-1897), French and Swiss politician and lawyer, served France as the Minister of Justice and President of the Senate
 Vladimir Lenin (1870–1924), lived in Geneva 1902–1905 as an exile from the Russian Empire
 Jean-Étienne Liotard (1702–1789), painter, art connoisseur and dealer
 Corinne Maier (born 1963), psychoanalyst, economist, and best-selling writer
 Ella Maillart (1903–1997), adventurer, travel writer and photographer, as well as a sportswoman
 Solomon Caesar Malan (1812–1894), oriental linguist and biblical scholar
 Jacques Mallet du Pan (1749–1800), Genevan-French royalist journalist
 Alexander Marcet FRS (1770–1822), physician who became a British citizen in 1800
 Jane Marcet (1769–1858), an innovative writer of popular introductory science books
 Sebastian Marka (born 1978), German film director and editor
 Frank Martin (1890–1974), composer, editor of The Statesman's Year Book
 Nicolas Maulini (born 1981), racing driver
 Dr. Théodore Maunoir (1806–1869), co-founder of the International Committee of the Red Cross
 Amélie Mauresmo (born 1979), former professional tennis player and former world No.1
 Barthélemy Menn (1815–1893), a landscape painter, introduced painting en plein air
 Heinrich Menu von Minutoli (1772–1846), a Prussian Generalmajor, explorer and archaeologist
 Jacques-Barthélemy Micheli du Crest (1690–1766), military engineer, physicist and cartographer
 Giorgio Mondini (born 1980), racing driver
 Stephanie Morgenstern (born 1965), Canadian actress, filmmaker and screenwriter
 Edoardo Mortara (born 1987), Swiss-Italian racing driver
 Thierry Moutinho (born 1991), Swiss-Portuguese footballer
 Gustave Moynier (1826–1910), lawyer and co-founder of the Red Cross

N–R 

 Jacques Necker (1732–1804), banker and finance minister for Louis XVI of France
 Louis Albert Necker (1786–1861), a crystallographer and geographer, devised the Necker cube
 Felix Neff (1798–1829), Protestant divine and philanthropist
 Alfred Newton FRS HFRSE (1829–1907), English zoologist and ornithologist
 Karim Ojjeh (born 1965), Saudi Arabian businessman and racing driver
 Julie Ordon (born 1984), model and actress
 Rémy Pagani (born 1954), politician, Mayor of Geneva 2009/10 and 2012/13
 Liliane Maury Pasquier (born 1956), politician
 PATjE (born 1970), birth name Patrice Jauffret, a singer, songwriter, and musician
 Faule Petitot (1572–1629), sculptor, cabinetmaker and architect, citizen of Geneva since 1615
 Jean Petitot (1607–1691), enamel painter, son of Faule
 Carmen Perrin (born 1953), Bolivian-born Swiss visual artist, designer, and educator.
 Jean Piaget (1896–1980), clinical psychologist, devised genetic epistemology
 Robert Pinget (1919–1997), an avant-garde French modernist nouveau roman writer
 George Pitt, 1st Baron Rivers (1721–1803), English diplomat and politician
 Barbara Polla (born 1950), medical doctor, gallery owner, art curator and writer
 James Pradier (1790–1852), Genevan and then Swiss sculptor, neoclassical style
 Jean-Louis Prévost (1838–1927), neurologist and physiologist
 Pierre Prévost (1751–1839), philosopher, physicist wrote the law of exchange in radiation
 Tariq Ramadan (born 1962), a Swiss Muslim academic, philosopher and writer
 Marcel Raymond (1897–1981), a literary critic of French literature of the "Geneva School"
 Flore Revalles (1889–1966), singer, dancer and actress
 Charles Pierre Henri Rieu (1820–1902), Orientalist and Professor of Arabic
 Prof Auguste Arthur de la Rive (1801–1873), a physicist, worked on the heat of gases
 Charles-Gaspard de la Rive (1770–1834), physicist, psychiatrist and politician 
 François Jules Pictet de la Rive (1809–1872), zoologist and palaeontologist
 Tibor Rosenbaum (1923–1980), rabbi and businessman
 Marc Rosset (born 1970), former pro tennis player, gold medallist at the 1992 Olympic Games
 Jean-Jacques Rousseau (1712–1778), writer and philosopher
 Jean Rousset (1910–2002), literary critic and early structuralism writer of the Geneva School 
 Xavier Ruiz (born 1970), film producer and director

S–Z 

 Ferdinand de Saussure (1857–1913), a linguist and semiotician
 Horace Bénédict de Saussure (1740–1799), geologist, meteorologist, physicist, and Alpine explorer
 Nicolas-Théodore de Saussure (1767–1845), chemist, studied plant physiology, advanced phytochemistry
 Léon Savary (1895–1968), writer and journalist
 Michael Schade (born 1965), a Canadian operatic tenor
 Johann Jacob Schweppe (1740–1821), watchmaker developed Schweppes bottled carbonated water
 Marguerite Sechehaye (1887–1965), a psychotherapist, treated people with schizophrenia
 Louis Segond (1810–1885), theologian and translator, pastor in Chêne-Bougeries
 Philippe Senderos (born 1985), footballer, over 200 club caps and 57 for Switzerland
 Jean Senebier (1742–1809), pastor and voluminous writer on vegetable physiology
Liberato Firmino Sifonia (1917-1996), an Italian composer
 Pierre Eugene du Simitiere (1737–1784), naturalist, American patriot and portrait painter.
 Michel Simon (1895–1975), actor
 Jean Charles Léonard de Sismondi (1773–1842), historian and political economist
 Edward Snowden (born 1983), lived in Geneva between 2007 and 2009, while working for the CIA
 Pierre Soubeyran (1706–1775), engraver, etcher and Encyclopédiste
 Terry Southern (1924–1995), American author, essayist and screenwriter; lived in Geneva 1956–59
 Ezekiel Spanheim (1629–1710), Prussian diplomat
 Friedrich Spanheim (1632–1701), a Calvinistic theology professor at the University of Leiden
 Jacques Charles François Sturm (1803–1855), French mathematician
 Émile Taddéoli (1879–1920), Swiss aviation pioneer
 Alain Tanner (born 1929), film director
 Sigismund Thalberg (1812–1871), Austrian composer and pianist
 Max Thurian (1921–1996), theologian, known as Frère Max
 Pierre Tirard (1827–1893), French politician
 Rodolphe Töpffer (1799–1846), teacher, author, painter, cartoonist and caricaturist
 Wolfgang-Adam Töpffer (1766–1847), painter of landscapes and watercolors
 Vico Torriani (1920–1998), singer, actor, show host
 Georges Trombert (1874–1949), a French fencer, silver and bronze medallist at the 1920 Summer Olympics
 Théodore Tronchin (1709–1781), a Genevan physician
 François Turrettini (1623–1687), a Genevan-Italian Reformed scholastic theologian
 Jean Alphonse Turrettini (1671–1737), reformed theologian
 Princess Vittoria of Savoy (2003), heir to the Italian throne
 François Vivares (1709–1780), French landscape-engraver, active in England
 Johann Vogel (born 1977), former footballer, played 94 games for Switzerland
 Prince Andrei Volkonsky (1933–2008), Russian composer of classical music and harpsichordist
 Voltaire (1694–1778), French philosopher, historian, dramatist and man of letters; lived at Les Délices 1755–1760
 Nedd Willard (1926–2018), writer
 R. Norris Williams (1891–1968), American tennis player and RMS Titanic survivor
 Pierre Wissmer (1915–1992), Swiss-French composer, pianist and music teacher
 Jean Ziegler (born 1934), politician and sociologist
 Reto Ziegler (born 1986), footballer, has played 35 games for Switzerland

See also 
 Outline of Geneva
 Bibliothèque Publique et Universitaire (Geneva)
 Boule de Genève
 Calvin Auditory, a chapel that played a significant role in the Reformation
 Circuit des Nations, the historic racetrack
 Franco-Provençal language
 Geneva Freeport
 Geneva Summit for Human Rights and Democracy

Notes

References

Bibliography 
 
 Joëlle Kuntz, Geneva and the call of internationalism. A history, éditions Zoé, 2011, 96 pages.

External links 

  

Geneva public transport 
Geneva Tourist Information Office
Geneva Tourist Shopping
Geneva Historical & Genealogical Society Collection 

 
Cities in Switzerland
Cantonal capitals of Switzerland
Populated places established in the 1st millennium BC
Associates of the Old Swiss Confederacy
Former theocracies
Counties of the Holy Roman Empire
Populated places on the Rhône
Populated places on Lake Geneva
Populated riverside places in Switzerland
Municipalities of the canton of Geneva